Bathyuroconger is a genus of eels in the family Congridae. It currently contains the following species:

 Bathyuroconger albus Smith, Ho, and Tashiro, 2018
 Bathyuroconger dolichosomus Smith, Ho, and Tashiro, 2018
 Bathyuroconger fowleri Smith, Ho, and Tashiro, 2018 (Fowler's large-toothed conger)
 Bathyuroconger hawaiiensis Smith, Ho, and Tashiro, 2018 (Hawaiian large-toothed conger)
 Bathyuroconger parvibranchialis (Fowler, 1934)
 Bathyuroconger vicinus (Vaillant, 1888) (Large-toothed conger)

References

 

Congridae